is a Japanese tokusatsu science fiction television series produced by Tsuburaya Productions, the series aired on Fuji TV from December 5, 1971 to November 26, 1972, with a total of 51 episodes. This was Tsuburaya Productions' first non-Ultra superhero (even though there were concepts that were similar to Ultraman, which became Tsuburaya trademarks). Like Ultraseven, Mirrorman was more of a dark and brooding science fiction drama than most other shows of its ilk, but by Episode 26, after major changes were forced upon the series by the network (making the action lighter and the hero more like Ultraman), it became a typical action-oriented superhero adventure of its era.

A short spinoff series titled Mirror Fight was broadcast on TV Tokyo from April 1, 1974 to September 27, 1974, with a total of 65 short episodes. It was similar in concept to the earlier Ultra Fight.

After years of sequel series rumors, the 2005 straight-to-DVD series Mirrorman REFLEX was released and later compiled into a film. Featuring no characters or connection to the old series, REFLEX has a darker tone on par with the first half of the original television series.

In July 2018, the series was released in United States, after 47 years, on the television channel Toku. A month later, the series was added to its streaming platform.

On June 7, 2021, Tsuburaya announced a manga reboot, Mirrorman 2D, written and drawn by Nobunagun's Masato Hisa, to celebrate Mirrorman's 50th anniversary. The series was made available on Tsuburaya's subscription service Tsuburaya Imagination and the Japanese online manga site Comiplex. Tsuburaya also made English subbed episodes of the original series available weekly on Mondays on the official Ultraman YouTube channel.

Plot 
In the 1980s, an evil alien race known simply as the Invaders are about to take over the Earth, using assorted daikaiju (giant monsters) and other fiendish plots. Assigned to investigate this threat is an organization called the Science Guard Members (SGM). But another hope comes from someone, unbeknownst even to himself, possessing otherworldly power. Professor Mitarai, the leader of SGM, finally shares a secret with his foster son, a young photojournalist named Kyôtarô Kagami ("kagami" = Japanese for "mirror"), a secret only he himself knows: Kyôtarô is a half-caste of an alien father and a human mother (both of whom are missing — captives of the Invaders). Kyôtarô discovers that he is actually the son of Mirrorman, a superhero from the 2nd Dimension.

However, the original Mirrorman was defeated by the Invaders' toughest monster King Zyger (explained in Episode 14), but his son Kyôtarô survived, and shares the same powers as his namesake. Naturally, the young man had difficulty accepting his destiny, but he soon realizes that he is the only one who can save the Earth from the Invaders, when they try to assassinate him. In order to transform into Mirrorman, Kyôtarô must stand in front of any reflective surface (mirrors, water, etc.), and flash his Mirror-Pendant, and utter the words "Mirror Spark".

Production Crew 

 Supervisor: Hajime Tsuburaya
 Producers: Toyoaki Tan, Kazuho Mitsuda, Koji Bessho, Tsutomu Yatai
 Script: Bunzo Wakatsuki, Keisuke Fujikawa, Hiroyasu Yamaura, Shigemitsu Taguchi, Toyohiro Ando, Showa Ohta
 Music: Toru Fuyuki
 Directors of Photography: Takeshi Goto, Toshiyuki Machida, Senkichi Nagai
 Lighting: Kazuo Kobayashi
 Production Designer: Akira Kikuchi
 Assistant Directors: Hiroshi Shimura, Takeshi Kitamura
 Props: Moriaki Uematsu
 Progress: Une Honkou, Yu Iwatsubo, Terukichi Kokubo

Special Effects Unit 

 Director of Photography: Katsutsugu Furuichi
 VFX Unit Cameraman Kunihiko Kimizuka
 Lighting: Yasuo Takakura
 Production Designer: Tetsuzo Osawa
 Assistant Director: Yoshiyuki Yoshimura
 Synthesis Technology: Minoru Nakano, Sadao Iizuka
 Practical Effects: Shoji Ogawa, Sadashige Tsukamoto, Fumio Nakadai, Kame Ogasawara, Eiji Shirakuma
 Mechanical Effects: Shigeo Kurakata
 Optical Photography: Kaneo Kimura, Michihisa Miyashige, Bunzo Hyodo, Kazuo Matsumoto
 Production Manager: Kazuo Ohashi
 Scripter Girls: Mihoko Kuroiwa, Keiko Suzuki, Haruyo Matsumaru, Kunie Nakanishi, Chieko Sawada, Masako Hisamatsu, Yoshie Yaguchi, Fumie Fuji, Settsu Kamiya
 Editing by: Yoshihiro Yanagawa
 Effect: Kiyasu Hara
 Production Managers: Masahiro Tsukahara, Masayuki Shitara
 In Charge of Production: Masahiro Tsukahara
 Recorded at: Central Recording 
 Film Processing: Tokyo Lab

Live Action Unit 

 Toshihiko Nakajima, Nobuo Ishiyama, Noriaki Yoshino, Shoichi Shinokawa, Tsuneko Ozeki, Takako Sekizawa, Kumiko Takagi

VFX Staff 

 Kiyotaka Matsumoto, Masao Sekiguchi, Kenichi Amano, Kazuo Takano, Yukitsu Kanno, Shuichi Kishiura

Special Thanks to 

 Sea Museum
 Hotel Shoto
 Yongda Boats
 Nagashima Onsen

Film

 is a 1972 Japanese tokusatsu superhero kaiju short film directed by Ishirō Honda. The film consists of re-edited material from the first episode of the original television series Mirrorman.

A tornado sucked the city into the sky, and mysterious events occurred one after another in various parts of the world, and people's lives were filled with anxiety. Journalist Kyotaro saw an enigmatic man standing in green liquid and a spaceship. The Invaders were about to invade the earth. Dr. Mitarai, who has advised Kyotaro for a long time on the earth's crisis, revealed a surprising fact to him. Kyotaro discovers that he is actually the son of Mirrorman, a superhero from the 2nd Dimension. Kyotaro was shocked. The city of Tokyo was about to be destroyed by another dimension monster, the Iron, a few days later. As Kyotaro listened to it, the voice of his dying father was heard. A few hours later, Iron and Mirrorman engaged in a fierce battle, but Iron collapsed before Mirrorman's Mirror Knife.

Cast 
Source:

 Nobuyuki Ishida as Kyoutarou Kagami
 Yōko Ichiji as Yuki Nomura
 Jun Usami as Dr. Mitarai
 Takako Sawai as Asami Mitari
 Hajime Sugiyama as Hidehiko Yasuda
 Shunya Wazaki as Hiroshi Murakami
 Kentaro Kudo as Takeshi Fujimoto
 Tadayoshi Kura as Ichiro Okawa

Release 
Mirrorman was released in Japan on March 12, 1972, where it was distributed by Toho, as part of the Spring 1972 Toho Champion Festival. It was accompanied by Godzilla vs. Gigan, Pinocchio: The Series, Hutch the Honeybee: Hold Me, Momma, and The Genius Bakabon: Night Duty is Scary.

In popular culture
The nickname "Mirrorman" was applied by the mass media and the Internet to Kazuhide Uekusa, an economist who was arrested in 2004 for sexual offenses involving looking up girls' skirts with a hand mirror.

Cameos and other appearances
 The characters of Chief Murakami, Yasuda and Nomura would later return in Jumborg Ace. A bank of Mirrorman can also be seen in one episode.
 The monster Gorgosaurus also appears in Ultraman Taro.
 The monster Dustpan would appear again in the Thai/Japanese co-production The 6 Ultra Brothers vs. the Monster Army.
 Mirror Knight, an homage to Mirrorman, appears in the film Ultraman Zero The Movie: Super Deciding Fight! The Belial Galactic Empire.

References

External links 
 Mirrorman 2005-2006 DVD boxset release

1971 Japanese television series debuts
1972 Japanese television series endings
Tokusatsu television series
Superhero television shows
Tsuburaya Productions
1970s Japanese television series
Fuji TV original programming
Fiction set in 1980
Television series set in 1980
Ultra television series